Brimeura is a genus of bulb-forming, monocotyledonous perennial plants. They have narrow leaves and bear bluebell-like flowers in Spring. Brimeura is treated in the family Asparagaceae, subfamily Scilloideae, tribe Hyacintheae, subtribe Hyacinthinae. It contains the following species

 Brimeura amethystina  (L.) Chouard - Pyrenees 
 Brimeura duvigneaudii (L.Llorens) Rosselló, Mus & Mayol - Mallorca
 Brimeura fastigiata  (Viv.) Chouard - Mallorca, Menorca, Corsica, Sardinia

Salisbury states that he named the genus in honour of the seventeenth century Netherlandish botanist and horticulturalist, Marie de Brimeu.

The genus is  native to southeastern Europe and certain islands of the western Mediterranean. The species B. amethystina (formerly Hyacinthus amethystina) has gained the Royal Horticultural Society's Award of Garden Merit.

References

Bibliography 

 
 
  (see also Angiosperm Phylogeny Website)

External links 

Pacific Bulb Society

Scilloideae
Asparagaceae genera
Taxonomy articles created by Polbot